Jonas Sjöstedt (born 25 December 1964) is a Swedish politician who was the chairman of the Left Party from 2012 until 2020, and a former metalworker. He is also a member of the Swedish parliament since 2010.

Sjöstedt was born in Gothenburg. He became politically active as a union leader in the Umeå Volvo plant in the early 1990s. Despite being opposed to Swedish membership of the European Union, he was elected Member of the European Parliament in 1995 for the Left Party as part of the European United Left-Nordic Green Left. He remained in that position until he stood down in September 2006. He was elected as a member in the Parliament of Sweden in 2010, representing Västerbotten. In the election, he was placed number one on the Left Party list (which generally receives one representative in this constituency), and was elected in a personal landslide of one third of all preference votes (a plurality above 8% being sufficient for a one seat-party).

In January 2020 Sjöstedt announced his intention to resign as the Left Party's leader at their congress in May, saying he wants to spend more time with his family who is currently living in Vietnam. Due to the COVID-19 pandemic, the congress was postponed, and Sjöstedt remained as party leader until the congress could be held on 31 October 2020, when Nooshi Dadgostar was elected as his successor.

Personal life
Living in New York City from 2006 to 2010, Sjöstedt is also a member of the Socialist Party USA. He writes for Swedish leftist publications, radio, and print columns, as well as works of history and fiction. He is married to Swedish diplomat Ann Måwe, who was part of the Swedish delegation to the United Nations.

References

External links

Bio at Radio UPF
EU Constitution: Political centralisation, economic liberalisation, austerity policy and militarization – not much left for the left in EU's constitution by Jonas Sjöstedt 20 February 2005.
Sjöstedt's website from his time as an MEP. (English Translation).
European Parliament Voting Record.
En vänsterman i New York Västerbottens-Kuriren, 3 December 2006. Interview on adjusting to life in New York City.

1964 births
Members of the Riksdag from the Left Party (Sweden)
Left Party (Sweden) MEPs
Living people
MEPs for Sweden 1995–1999
MEPs for Sweden 1999–2004
MEPs for Sweden 2004–2009
Swedish socialists
Articles containing video clips
Socialist Party USA politicians from New York (state)
People from Gothenburg